Sinner or Saint is a 1923 American silent drama film directed by Lawrence C. Windom and starring Betty Blythe, William P. Carleton and Gypsy O'Brien.

Cast
 Betty Blythe as Mademoiselle Iris
 William P. Carleton as Paul Reynolds
 Gypsy O'Brien as Marguerite Roberts
 William H. Tooker as Stephen Roberts
 Fuller Mellish as Elijah Homes
 Richard Neill as Charles Carter
 William Collier Jr. as Young Artist

References

Bibliography
 Robert B. Connelly. The Silents: Silent Feature Films, 1910-36, Volume 40, Issue 2. December Press, 1998.

External links
 

1923 films
1923 drama films
1920s English-language films
American silent feature films
Silent American drama films
American black-and-white films
Films directed by Lawrence C. Windom
Selznick Pictures films
1920s American films